The Comeback is an American television comedy-drama series produced by HBO that stars actress Lisa Kudrow as sitcom actress Valerie Cherish in modern-day Los Angeles. It was created by Kudrow and Michael Patrick King, a former executive producer of Sex and the City. Kudrow and King are also screenwriters and executive producers of the series, with King also serving as the director of some episodes. The series premiered on HBO on June 5, 2005 and aired for a single, 13-episode season before being canceled. The series was revived nine years later and an eight-episode second season started airing on HBO on November 9, 2014.

, 21 episodes of The Comeback have aired, concluding its second season.

Series overview 

{| class="wikitable" style="text-align: center;"
|-
! style="padding: 0 8px;" colspan="2" rowspan="2"| Season
! style="padding: 0 8px;" rowspan="2"| Episodes
! colspan="2"| Originally aired
|-
! style="padding: 0 8px;"| First aired
! Last aired
|-
 |style="background: #19AFC7;"|
 |1
 |style="padding: 0 8px;"| 13
 |style="padding: 0 8px;"| 
 |style="padding: 0 8px;"| 
|-
 |style="background: #AE1715;"|
 |2
 |style="padding: 0 8px;"| 8
 |style="padding: 0 8px;"| 
 |style="padding: 0 8px;"| 
|-
|}

Episodes

Season 1 (2005)

Season 2 (2014)

Future 
Kudrow said in late 2014 that she and King felt the network was interested in producing a third season. In an interview with E!, Kudrow also said: "I would love to do more. In 2005, that was an ending, that was definitely an ending because I guess now we see that those episodes were a piece and these episodes were a piece and then if we do more than we will be doing that piece."

References 

Lists of American comedy-drama television series episodes